If I Were You is a fantasy novel written by L. Ron Hubbard and was originally published in the February 1940 issue of Five-Novels Monthly Magazine.

Plot
The story revolves around carnival midget “Tom Little” who is loved by the public and carnival folk alike. Although he is a successful circus star, his all-consuming desire to be as tall and imposing as the carnival chief eventually comes to fruition, but not without severe consequences.

It all starts with the discovery of a set of ancient books containing the secret of switching bodies. With this knowledge, Tom can finally trade his small frame for the tall, larger than life frame of the lion tamer carnival chief.

Publication history
If I Were You was written and published in 1940.

If I Were You is from the Golden Age series which Galaxy Press started re-publishing in 2008. The book has been re-released in paperback. It is also available as a full-cast audiobook featuring Nancy Cartwright. Also starring Lynsey Bartilson, R.F. Daley, Bob Caso, Jim Meskimen, Jennifer Darling, John Mariano, Phil Proctor, and Tait Ruppert.

Reviews
SF Site: Gil T. Wilson

References

1940 American novels
American fantasy novels
Novels by L. Ron Hubbard
Works originally published in American magazines